Michael Chukwubunna Ijezie (born 6 September 1987) is a Nigerian footballer who plays as a forward for Kuching City.

References

External links
 

Living people
1987 births
Nigerian footballers
Nigerian expatriate footballers
Association football forwards
UKM F.C. players
Southern Myanmar F.C. players
Kuching City F.C. players
Malaysia Premier League players